Ivanpah is a ghost town in Greenwood County, Kansas, United States.

History
Ivanpah had a post office from 1879 until 1904.

References

Further reading

External links
 Greenwood County maps: Current, Historic, KDOT

Ghost towns in Kansas